José Álvarez de Toledo y Acuña (August 6, 1838 – August 31, 1898) was a senior Spanish politician and diplomat.

In June 1864, Queen Isabella II of Spain granted then 26-year-old Álvarez the title , a county in present day Murcia. He used this to jump start his political career, being elected that same year to the Congress of Deputies, the lower house of the Cortes Generales, for the comarca of Torrecilla en Cameros, province of Logroño. He was re-elected as a Deputy, for the comarca of Logroño, province of Logroño, in 1865, 1867 and 1876.

In 1879, just five years into the restored monarchy under Alfonso XII, Álvarez was elected to the upper house, the Senate of Spain, as the Senator for the Canary Islands.

In 1881, he returned to the Congress as the Deputy for the district of Aguadilla, Puerto Rico (still part of the Spanish Empire). In 1886, he was elected as Deputy for the municipality of Toledo, province of Toledo.

In December 1888, Prime Minister Práxedes Mateo Sagasta brought Álvarez onto the Spanish Council of State, during the regency (for her child, Alfonso XIII) of Maria Christina of Austria. Álvarez served as the Minister of Public Works and the Economy until January 1890.

In 1891, Álvarez returned to the Senate, representing Jaén, and in 1893 became the Senator for Santa Clara, Cuba.

Álvarez left his Senate seat in 1894, when he was appointed President of the Council of State. In October 1897, Prime Minister Sagasta assigned Álvarez the added responsibility of Minister of Public Works and the Economy, which he held until May 1898.

Álvarez was also a civil governor of the province of Madrid.

References

1838 births
1898 deaths
José Álvarez de Toledo y Acuña
Moderate Party (Spain) politicians
19th-century Spanish politicians
Liberal Party (Spain, 1880) politicians
Members of the Congress of Deputies (Spain)
Members of the Congress of Deputies of the Spanish Restoration
Members of the Senate of Spain
Civil governors of Madrid